Tharkappu is a 2016 Tamil language action thriller film directed by R.P. Ravi and produced by S. Selvamuthu and Manjunath. The film stars Shakthi Vasudevan and Samuthirakani. The film's original soundtrack has been composed by F. S. Faizal, while the film released on 1 January 2016.

Cast  
 Shakthi Vasudevan as Inspector  Sakthivel 
 Samuthirakani as Iraianbu
 Sathish Krishnan as Jai
 Vatsan Chakravarthy as Vino
 Vaishali Deepak as Meenu
 Amitha as Aditi
 Riyaz Khan as Arjun
 Ganesh Prasath as Ganesh
 Kebi Raj

Soundtrack 
The soundtrack was composed  by F. S. Faisal. The original soundtrack consists of the following tracks:

Release 
The trailer of Tharkappu was released in Malaysia on 27 December 2015 and a premiere show was held thereafter in the country.  The film was released on 1 January 2016 to mixed reviews. A critic added "Tharkappu begins well only to lose steam as it progresses", "but is worth a watch for the twists and turns". In contrast, a reviewer from nettv4u.com suggested that the film is a "must watch for its powerful message".

References

External links 
 

2010s Tamil-language films
2016 action thriller films
2016 films
Fictional portrayals of the Tamil Nadu Police
Indian action thriller films
Indian nonlinear narrative films
2016 directorial debut films